Ada C. Bello (born November 6, 1933) is a Cuban American LGBT rights activist and medical laboratory researcher. She was a founder of the Philadelphia Chapter of Daughters of Bilitis and the Homophile Action League. Bello led activism efforts for the LGBT community beginning in the late 1960s and continues to serve in advocacy roles including as a board member of the LGBT Elder Initiative.

Early life and education 
Bello was born on November 6, 1933, in Havana, Cuba. Her mother was a homemaker from Madeira and her father was a lawyer and judge. She lived in Matanzas before moving to Havana to study. Bello attended University of Havana from 1953 to 1956 before transferring to Louisiana State University after Fulgencio Batista closed the university. She earned a degree in chemistry from LSU. She resided in Baton Rouge, Louisiana from 1958 to 1961 before moving to Picayune, Mississippi for a year.

Career 
Bello worked for the University of Pennsylvania as a medical laboratory assistant from 1962 to 1980. She became a medical laboratory researcher at University of Pennsylvania in 1980 and later worked for the Food and Drug Administration.

Activism 
Bello moved to Philadelphia in 1962 where she participated in LGBT social and political organizing. These nascent actions became known as the homophile movement. In 1967, Bello became a founding member of the Philadelphia Chapter of the Daughters of Bilitis (DOB). Bello edited the DOB-Philadelphia newsletter with fellow activist Carole Friedman. They both influenced the decision to dissolve DOB and create the Homophile Action League (HAL) in 1968. Bello worked as the editor of the HAL newsletter which challenged police harassment against the LGBT community. In 1968, Bello decided to become an activist after the Philadelphia Police Department raided Rusty's bar and arrested 12 women. HAL requested meeting with the police department. Due to her immigration status, Bello did not participate directly in the meetings, but drove the car. Bello attended the final Annual Reminder day protest in 1969, having received U.S. citizenship that year. Bello's advocacy efforts in the late 1960s and early 1970s served as a "bridge between pre- and post- stonewall political activities."

Bello volunteered for the American Library Association's Gay Task Force under Barbara Gittings and was a supporter of the William Way LGBT Community Center where she served as co-chair. Bello served on the board of the Philadelphia Lesbian and Gay Task Force. She organized the predecessor of the AIDS Fund, the From All Walks of Life. She served on the panel at the LGBT Aging Summit in 2010. She is on the board of the LGBT Elder Initiative.

Awards and honors 
Bello received the 2015 David Acosta Revolutionary Leader Award (DARLA) from the Gay and Lesbian Latino AIDS Education Initiative (GALAEI).

References 

Living people
1933 births
People from Havana
Cuban people of Portuguese descent
People of Madeiran descent
People from Matanzas
University of Havana alumni
Louisiana State University alumni
University of Pennsylvania faculty
Food and Drug Administration people
Cuban lesbians
LGBT people from Pennsylvania
Activists from Philadelphia
Cuban LGBT rights activists
American LGBT rights activists
LGBT Hispanic and Latino American people
People with acquired American citizenship
Cuban emigrants to the United States
American medical researchers
Women medical researchers
American people of Portuguese descent
American women academics
Women civil rights activists
20th-century Cuban LGBT people
21st-century Cuban LGBT people
21st-century American women